This is a list of commercial banks in the Gambia

 Access Bank Gambia
 Arab Gambia Islamic Bank
 Banque Sahélo-Saharienne pour l'Investissement et le Commerce
 Ecobank Gambia
 First Bank Nigeria (Gambia) Limited
 FiBank Limited
 Guaranty Trust Bank Gambia
 MegaBank Gambia Limited
 Skye Bank Gambia
 Standard Chartered Bank
Tong Shang International Commercial Bank (Gambia)
 Trust Bank Gambia Limited
 Zenith Bank Gambia Limited

See also

 List of banks in Africa
 Central Bank of The Gambia
 List of companies based in The Gambia

References

External links
 Website of Central Bank of The Gambia

 
Banks
Gambia
Gambia